This is a chronological list of Iraq War-related documentaries.

List 
 In Shifting Sands (2001)
 Back to Babylon (2002)
 About Baghdad (2003)
 Baghdad or Bust (2004)
 Control Room (2004)
 Inside Iraq: The Untold Stories (2004) 
 Iraq Raw: The Tuttle Tapes (2004)
 Last Letters Home (2004)
 Soldiers Pay (2004)
 Uncovered: The War on Iraq (2004)
 Voices of Iraq (2004)
 War Feels Like War (2004)
 War with Iraq: Stories from the Front (2004)
 We Iraqis (2004)
 Alpha Company: Iraq Diary (2005)
 American Soldiers (2005)
 Confronting Iraq: Conflict and Hope (2005) 
 The Dreams of Sparrows (2005)
 Gunner Palace (2005)
 In the Shadow of the Palms (2005)
 Iraqi War: The Untold Stories (2005)
 Occupation: Dreamland (2005)
 Off to War: From Rural Arkansas to Iraq (2005)
 Why We Fight (2005)
 Baghdad ER (2006)
 The Corporal's Boots (2006)
 The Ground Truth (2006)
 Iraq for Sale: The War Profiteers (2006)
 Iraq in Fragments (2006)
 My Country, My Country (2006)
 Nice Bombs (2006)
 No Substitute / Victory: Vietnam to Iraq (2006)
 Shadow Company (2006)
 The War Tapes (2006)
 When I Came Home (2006)
 Alive Day Memories: Home from Iraq (2007)
 Body of War (2007)
 Buying the War (2007)
 Ghosts of Abu Ghraib (2007)
 I Am an American Soldier (2007)
 Jerebek (2007) 
 No End in Sight (2007)
 Operation Homecoming: Writing the Wartime Experience (2007)
 This Is War: Memories of Iraq (2007)
 Three Soldiers (2007)
 Year at Danger (2007)
 PBS Frontline: Bad Voodoo's War (2008)
 Bulletproof Salesman (2008) 
 Changing Us (2008)
 The Corporal's Diary: 38 Days in Iraq (2008)
 Leading to War (2008)
 Fighting for Life (2008)
 Lioness (2008)
 My Vietnam, Your Iraq (2008) 
 Reserved to Fight (2008)
 Brothers at War (2009)
 Triangle of Death (2009)
 Poster Girl (2010)
 This is War (2010)
 The Tillman Story (2010)
 The Unreturned (2010)
 The War You Don't See (2010)
 The Iraq War: Regime Change (2013) 
Only the Dead (Australian documentary, 2015)
Apache Warrior (Netflix documentary film, 2017)
Medal of Honor (Netflix TV series, 2018)
Once Upon a Time in Iraq (2020)
 that which i love destroys me (2015)
 Life After War: Iraq  (2022)

References

External links 
 List with summaries and links to some videos

Doco
Lists of documentaries